LWY may refer to:

 LWY, the IATA code for Lawas Airport, Sarawak, Malaysia
 LWY, the station code for Longwarry railway station, Victoria, Australia